The Samuel Baker House is an historic site in Elfers, Florida. It was built in 1882, and is located at 5742 Moog Road. On February 14, 1997, it was added to the National Register of Historic Places.

References

External links
 
 Pasco County listings at National Register of Historic Places
 Florida's Office of Cultural and Historical Programs

Houses on the National Register of Historic Places in Florida
Museums in Pasco County, Florida
Historical society museums in Florida
Vernacular architecture in Florida
Historic house museums in Florida
Houses in Pasco County, Florida
National Register of Historic Places in Pasco County, Florida
1882 establishments in Florida
Houses completed in 1882